Egyptian Coast Guard, part of the Egyptian Army, is responsible for the onshore protection of public installations near the coast and the patrol of coastal waters to prevent smuggling. Currently consists of one hundred five ships and craft. The Egyptian Coast Guard has over 5,000 personnel.

Patrol boats

 22 Timsah I/II class
 12 Sea Spectre PB Mk III class
 9 Swiftships class
 6 MV70 class
 5 P-6 (Project 183) class
 3 Textron class

Patrol crafts

 25 Swiftships 26m class
 16 SR.N6 class
 9 Type 83 class
 6 Crestitalia class
 12 Spectre class
 12 Peterson class
 5 Nisr class
 29 DC-30 class
 3 of 6 MRTP-20 Yonka Onuk MRTP-20 class

See also
 Port security
 Maritime security regime

References

Egyptian Navy
Coast guards
Law enforcement agencies of Egypt
1887 establishments in Egypt